Taylor Fritz defeated Rafael Nadal in the final, 6–3, 7–6(7–5) to win the men's singles tennis title at the 2022 Indian Wells Masters. It was his maiden Masters 1000 title and second career title overall. Fritz became the first American to win the title since Andre Agassi in 2001, and ended Nadal's 20-match winning streak, dating back to the 2022 Melbourne Open.

Cameron Norrie was the defending champion, but lost in the quarterfinals to Carlos Alcaraz, who became the youngest Indian Wells semifinalist since Agassi in 1988.

This was the first ATP Tour tournament since the international governing bodies of tennis (WTA, ATP, ITF, Australian Open, French Open, Wimbledon, US Open) allowed players from Russia and Belarus to continue to participate in tennis events on Tour and at the majors, but not under the name or flag of Russia or Belarus until further notice, due to the 2022 Russian invasion of Ukraine. 

Daniil Medvedev and Novak Djokovic were in contention for the world No. 1 singles ranking. Despite his withdrawal from the tournament, Djokovic reclaimed the ranking after Medvedev lost to Gaël Monfils in the third round.

With his third-round win, Nadal became the first player to win 400 ATP Masters 1000 matches.

Seeds
All seeds received a bye into the second round.

Draw

Finals

Top half

Section 1

Section 2

Section 3

Section 4

Bottom half

Section 5

Section 6

Section 7

Section 8

Seeded players

The following are the seeded players, based on ATP rankings as of March 7, 2022. Rank and points before are as of March 7, 2022.

As a result of pandemic-related adjustments to the ranking system and changes to the ATP Tour calendar in 2021, ranking points after the tournament (as of March 21, 2022) will be calculated as follows:

 Points from tournaments held during the weeks of March 8 and March 15, 2021 (Doha, Marseille, Santiago, Dubai and Acapulco) will be dropped at the end of the tournament and replaced by points from the 2022 Indian Wells tournament.
 Players who are not defending points from the tournaments listed above will have their 19th best result replaced by their points from the 2022 tournament.
 Points from the 2021 tournament will not drop until October 17, 2022 (52 weeks after the 2021 tournament) and are accordingly not reflected in this table.
 The other half of the remaining points from the 2019 tournament will be dropped on March 21, 2022, around three years after the end of the 2019 tournament.

† This column shows either (a) the player's ranking points dropping on March 14 or March 21, 2022, or (b) his 19th best result (shown in brackets). Only ranking points counting towards the player's ranking as of March 7, 2022, are reflected in the column.
‡ The player is defending points from a 2019 ATP Challenger Tour tournament (Phoenix)

Withdrawn players
The following player would have been seeded, but withdrew before the tournament began.

Other entry information

Wildcards

Source:

Protected ranking

Qualifiers

Lucky losers

Withdrawals

Qualifying

Seeds

Qualifiers

Lucky losers

Qualifying draw

First qualifier

Second qualifier

Third qualifier

Fourth qualifier

Fifth qualifier

Sixth qualifier

Seventh qualifier

Eighth qualifier

Ninth qualifier

Tenth qualifier

Eleventh qualifier

Twelfth qualifier

References

External links
 Main draw
 Qualifying draw

BNP Paribas Open - Singles
Singles men